Gustavia gracillima is a species of woody plant in the family Lecythidaceae. It is found in Colombia and Ecuador.

References

gracillima
Vulnerable plants
Endemic flora of Colombia
Taxonomy articles created by Polbot
Plants described in 1874